Dumitru Munteanu (3 July 1932 – 19 June 2020) was a Romanian footballer.

Club career

Dumitru Munteanu was born on 3 July 1932 in Bucharest and spent his entire career from junior to senior level playing alongside his twin brother Anton Munteanu, both of them being known for their dribbling abilities and spectacular play. He grew up in Dămăroaia and started to play junior level football at the local club, afterwards going at Laromet București, before moving at CCA Cluj where he spent only two weeks, then he joined Gloria Bistrița, a team he helped reach in 1954 a promotion play-off to Divizia B which was eventually lost. He made his Divizia A debut on 6 May 1955, playing for CCA București in a 1–0 loss against Flamura Roșie Arad, this being his only league appearance for the team. In 1956 he went to play for Petrolul Ploiești where he spent 9 seasons in which he helped the club win two Divizia A titles, in the first from the 1957–58 season he was used by coach Ilie Oană in 11 matches in which he scored three goals and in the second from the 1965–66 season, he was used by coach Constantin Cernăianu in 3 matches. In 1958, he and his brother were banned for life from playing football because they were considered "rebels" and "bourgeois elements" by the Communist regime, but after one year they were allowed to play again. In 1961 after Petrolul played a friendly against Brazilian team, Grêmio Porto Alegre which ended with a 4–3 victory in which he and his brother were appreciated for their play, they were nicknamed "The Brazilians". Munteanu also helped The Yellow Wolves win the 1962–63 Cupa României and made his last Divizia A appearance playing for them on 8 May 1966 in a 2–1 home victory against CSMS Iași. He has a total of 136 matches and 19 goals scored in Divizia A, 19 matches and six goals scored in Cupa României and 11 games in European competitions (including 7 appearances in the Inter-Cities Fairs Cup). Dumitru Munteanu died on 19 June 2020 at age 87.

International career
Dumitru Munteanu made one appearance for Romania's national team when coach Constantin Teașcă sent him on the field in the 25th minute in order to replace Ion Nunweiller in a friendly against East Germany which ended with a 3–2 loss.

Honours
CCA București
Cupa României: 1955
Petrolul Ploiești
Divizia A: 1957–58, 1965–66
Cupa României: 1962–63

Notes

References

External links
Dumitru Munteanu at Labtof.ro

1932 births
2020 deaths
Romanian footballers
Romania international footballers
Association football forwards
Liga I players
ACF Gloria Bistrița players
FC Petrolul Ploiești players
FC Steaua București players
Sportspeople from Bucharest
Romanian twins
Twin sportspeople